Kadir Bekmezci (born 5 July 1985) is a Belgian professional footballer of Turkish descent who plays as an attacking midfielder for Turkish amateur side Devrek Belediyespor.

Club career
Bekmezci, born in Belgium, formerly played for Standard Liège. He also played for several other Belgian clubs, including K. Beringen-Heusden-Zolder, K.A.S. Eupen, and K.F.C. Verbroedering Geel. Hacettepe transferred Bekmezci in August 2007. He spent two years at the club before Sivasspor acquired his services in August 2009.

References

External links
 
 

1985 births
Belgian people of Turkish descent
Sportspeople from Genk
Footballers from Limburg (Belgium)
Living people
Belgian footballers
Turkish footballers
Association football midfielders
Standard Liège players
K.A.S. Eupen players
Hacettepe S.K. footballers
Sivasspor footballers
Antalyaspor footballers
Boluspor footballers
Elazığspor footballers
Challenger Pro League players
Süper Lig players
TFF First League players
TFF Second League players